Teslui is a commune in Dolj County, Oltenia, Romania with a population of 2,781 people. It is composed of eight villages: Coșereni, Fântânele, Preajba de Jos, Preajba de Pădure, Teslui, Țărțăl, Urieni and Viișoara-Moșneni.

References

Communes in Dolj County
Localities in Oltenia